Juan Castro  (25 January 1547 – 1 August 1611) was a Roman Catholic prelate who served as Archbishop of Santafé en Nueva Granada (1608–1609).

Biography
Luis Zapata de Cárdenas was born in Toledo, Spain on 25 Jan 1547 and ordained a priest in the Order of Saint Augustine. On 7 Jan 1608, he was appointed during the papacy of Pope Paul V as Archbishop of Santafé en Nueva Granada. He served as Archbishop of Santafé en Nueva Granada until his resignation in Jun 1609. He died on 1 Aug 1611.

References

External links and additional sources
 (for Chronology of Bishops) 
 (for Chronology of Bishops) 

17th-century Roman Catholic bishops in New Granada
Bishops appointed by Pope Paul V
1547 births
1611 deaths
Augustinian bishops
People from Toledo, Spain
Spanish Roman Catholic bishops in South America
Roman Catholic archbishops of Bogotá